Yarmouth Lifeboat station (not to be confused with ) is an RNLI station located in the town of Yarmouth on the Isle of Wight in the United Kingdom. The station has been based in Yarmouth's harbour since 1924. Previously the station had been in Totland Bay, west of Yarmouth, until it was decided that the station need a motor lifeboat. The current Severn-class lifeboat is moored afloat and shore facilities are on the quayside in Yarmouth. The station covers the western Solent with its all-weather lifeboat Eric and Susan Hiscock (Wanderer) (ON-1249) which has been on service at Yarmouth since 2001.

Eric and Susan Hiscock (Wanderer) 
She is operated by a crew of six and is fitted with the latest in navigation, location and communication equipment including electronic chart plotter, VHF radio with direction finder, radar and global positioning systems (GPS). Having the Y-class enables the crew to make rescues close to shore.

Station history

Totland Bay 

The first established station to cover the western Solent dates from 1879 and was located west of Yarmouth in Totland Bay. To fund this service money was raised by the local Isle of Wight Sunday Schools Committee. The first lifeboat was Dove, manned by local volunteers. In the first five years of the service the lifeboat and her crew proved to be a great success and over that period the lives of 36 people were saved when they were brought ashore. The record of this first lifeboat convinced the RNLI of the need and viability of formalising a service on this part of the Isle of Wight. In 1884 funds were made available to build a lifeboat house and a new lifeboat was sent to the station. This lifeboat was called Charles Luckombe and she was a self-righting pulling lifeboat powered by 12 oars. She began service at Totland bay in 1885 Charles Luckombe was replaced in 1903 by Robert Fleming, funded in part by a memorial bequest of £1,000 made to the RNLI. The lifeboat was launched by Emily Seely, wife of John Edward Bernard Seely, the local Member of Parliament.

Relocation to Yarmouth 
In 1924 the RNLI decided that lifeboat cover for the western end of the Solent would be better served by a motor lifeboat. The Totland boathouse was closed and the station was moved to Yarmouth harbour, with service buildings onshore and the boats kept in the harbour.

Motor Lifeboat 
The first motor lifeboat at the new Yarmouth location was the Watson-class B.A.S.P. (ON-687). The lifeboat, built by J. Samuel White, was also equipped with sails in case of engine failure. The lifeboat was named by His Royal Highness Edward the Prince of Wales. She was named B.A.S.P. after the donors, Blackburn, Armstrong, Smart and Price. During her ten years of service at the station, B.A.S.P. undertook 42 operations which saved 30 lives. After service at several other stations and in the Relief Fleet, she was sold in 1955. B.A.S.P. is now on display at as part of the Historic Lifeboat Collection at the maritime museum in Chatham. B.A.S.P. is entered in the National Historic Ships register and has the Certificate No: 1687.

Inshore Lifeboat 
In July 1964 the station established an inshore lifeboat service but this was permanently withdrawn in October 1978.

Improvements 
In 1988 the Institute made improvements to the onshore facilities for the station. They provided a kitchen, toilets and washrooms within the existing boatstore. In 1994 the RNLI purchased the Yarmouth Customs House on the quayside in Quay Street and began alterations to the building. This work included creating crew changing rooms, workshop, toilet and showers, and an RNLI souvenir and retail outlet on the ground floor. An office, training room, and crew facilities were built on the first floor. In 2000 work was carried out in the harbour to improve the lifeboat berth.

Notable rescues

Al Kwather 1 
On 28 October 1989 the Arun-class Margaret Russell Fraser (ON-1108) relief lifeboat was launched to service from Yarmouth with Coxswain David Kennett at the helm. The weather in the Solent was poor with a south westerly severe gale force 9 blowing. The roll-on/roll-off cargo vessel Al Kwather 1 was reported to be in difficulties three and a half miles east of Peveril Point near Swanage. Some of the ship's cargo of cars had broken loose on the deck. The Swanage Rother-class lifeboat Horace Clarkson (ON-1047) had been on the scene since 11.30 am and in hurricane-force winds was standing by the vessel. At 3.10 pm the Margaret Russell Fraser arrived on the scene and took up a position astern of the Al Kwather 1 whilst the Swanage lifeboat returned to its station. The Al Kwather 1 appeared to be in no danger and so after an hour the Yarmouth boat also made for Swanage to allow the crew to get some rest and do initiate some minor repairs to the boat. Just after midnight the captain of the Al Kwather 1 reported that his vessel had problems with its engines and requested help. Both lifeboats left Swanage with the Margaret Russell Fraser arriving first to find the ship in complete darkness and listing to port and rolling violently, broadside to the seas. The lifeboat used her searchlights on approaching the ship from the stern and with great skill, and a great deal of danger, manoeuvred alongside the ship and rescued two of the crew who were hanging on to a cargo net they had clambered down. This proved to be very dangerous and one of the crew men rescued had fallen from the net. His foot had caught in the net and hanging below the deck of the lifeboat, the crew had managed to haul him to safety. News arrived that a helicopter was en route and it was used to rescue the remaining crewman from the ship. The lifeboats then returned to their stations. Coxswain Kennett was awarded an RNLI Bronze Medal for his part in the service. Assistant Mechanic Brian Miskin and crewman Joseph Lester were presented with framed letters. The Coxswain of the Swanage lifeboat, Christopher Haw was accorded the Thanks of the Institution on Vellum.

Gallery

Neighbouring Station Locations

References 

 
Organisations based on the Isle of Wight
Lifeboat stations on the Isle of Wight
Buildings and structures on the Isle of Wight
Yarmouth, Isle of Wight